The Lawtey Correctional Institution (also LCI) is a Level 3 security prison facility for adult males in  
Lawtey, Florida, U.S.A. The facility was established in 1973 as a Community Vocational Center Housing for work release inmates. In 1977 it switched to a major institution housing for adult male inmates. In 2004, the Correctional Institution became a male Faith- and Character-Based Institution (FCBI). The Dinsmore Work Release Center,  the Bridges of Jacksonville Work Release Center, and the Shisa East Work Release Center are today under the supervision of LCI.

The total staff in 2012 was 237 and has a maximum inmate capacity of 832.

References

Prisons in Florida
1973 establishments in Florida